Jimtown is an extinct town in Andrew County, in the U.S. state of Missouri. The GNIS classifies it as a populated place, but the exact location of the town site is unknown.

Jimtown was founded in 1839. A post office called Jamestown was established in 1841, and remained in operation until 1850.

References

Ghost towns in Missouri
Former populated places in Andrew County, Missouri